Kids Pick the President is a series of specials produced by the Nickelodeon TV network, organized around a mock election to determine children's choice for the 
President of the United States. Since 1988, Kids Pick the President has accurately predicted the winner of each election with the exceptions of the 2004 and 2016 presidential elections.

History
The specials began in 1988 as part of a yearly "Kids Vote" election-related coverage, in part as a way to encourage children in Nickelodeon's audience to become engaged in the political process, and partly for comedic value.

The 1992 election was sponsored by Target Corporation, and promoted by newspaper advertisements.  Children voted in-person at Target's stores, which were used as polling stations.

In the 1996 election, conducted by televote, children picked Bill Clinton over Bob Dole and Ross Perot.

In the 2000 poll, 400,000 people participated via an 800 number.  Both Al Gore and George W. Bush made campaign appearances at the Nickelodeon studios.

In 2004, Nickelodeon promoted the event with interstitials throughout its regular programming, features in Nickelodeon Magazine, online activities, and a book.  Both John Kerry and George W. Bush declined to appear, stating they were too busy.  The results were announced by Linda Ellerbee on U-Pick Live.  Kerry received 57 percent of the vote; President Bush got 43 percent. This would be the first vote where its results went against those of the general election.

In 2008, 2.2 million people participated in the event.  Both major candidates participated, and filmed television commercials promoting the event as well as appearing in non-biased candidate biographies which aired on Nick. Participants were allowed to vote, without any voter eligibility or verification, on a non-partisan page of Nickelodeon's website that outlined the candidates' positions on various issues. Barack Obama received 51 percent (1,167,087 votes), and John McCain received 49 percent (1,129,945 votes).  Linda Ellerbee announced the results live again in 2008.

In 2012 Obama won with 65% of the vote over Republican challenger Mitt Romney. Romney declined to participate, citing scheduling constraints; instead, clips were shown from previous campaign events in which the participants' questions were addressed. In contrast, Obama invited the participants to meet him in person at the White House to answer their questions. The decision by Romney to not participate was considered by Nick News host Linda Ellerbee to be an example of his lack of "respect" for youth; the Obama campaign also responded by stating that children "demand details", and wanted "answers on why Romney could increase their class sizes, eliminate their teacher's jobs, raise taxes on their families and slash funding for Big Bird."

In 2016, Nickelodeon's poll conducted 3 candidates: Republican Donald Trump, Democrat Hillary Clinton, and Libertarian Gary Johnson. Nickelodeon only offered information on the Democratic and Republican nominees. It was the first election since Ellerbee's retirement, and this was reflected in coverage which was seen less on Nickelodeon than in the past, with the results offered in a short feature during a Saturday night 'theme night' revolving around elections in episodes of the network's sitcom block. Clinton was the winner, with 53 percent of the vote; Trump received 36 percent while Johnson received 11 percent; this would be the second time the kids vote would not match the winner of the general election.

In 2020, Nickelodeon's poll was conducted between Trump and his Democratic challenger, Joe Biden. The results of the poll was announced during a one-hour Nick News special titled Nick News: Kids Pick the President hosted by Keke Palmer and simulcast on Nickelodeon, Nicktoons, and TeenNick on October 27. Libertarian candidate Jo Jorgensen voiced her disapproval with the children's network for leaving her off the poll and stated they were "complicit in indoctrinating our children that there are only 2 parties". On October 21, the network detected cheating, when threads on online forums began discussing corrupting the Kids Pick the President site with fraudulent votes. Eventually, more than 130,000 bot-generated votes were detected and Nickelodeon utilized a voter certification tool to identify these counterfeit votes and to remove them, ensuring that only individually placed votes counted toward the total. Biden won the poll with 53% of the vote, followed by Trump with 47%.

Table of elections

Other children's elections
The "Scholastic Election" has been conducted by Scholastic Corporation Scholastic News every election year since 1940.  It claims to have predicted the final election results correctly with three exceptions: Harry S. Truman's win over Thomas E. Dewey in the 1948 United States presidential election, John F. Kennedy's win over Richard Nixon in the 1960 United States presidential election, and Donald Trump's win over Hillary Clinton in the 2016 United States presidential election.

Mock elections also take place in school classrooms, as part of a curriculum exercise in the American democratic process, with different programs designed for kindergarten through high school students. Such examples include the 2020 statewide mock election in Tennessee with results announced by the Tennessee Secretary of State. In the vote, Trump defeated Joe Biden with 52% of the vote, with third-party candidate Kanye West earning 10%.

References

External links
Official Site

1980s Nickelodeon original programming
1990s Nickelodeon original programming
2000s Nickelodeon original programming
2010s Nickelodeon original programming
2020s Nickelodeon original programming
1980s American children's television series
1990s American children's television series
2000s American children's television series
2010s American children's television series
2020s American children's television series
American children's education television series